The Lieuvin is a plateau region in the western part of the Eure département in Normandy, France.

The plateau consists of typical Norman bocage and is bounded by the Seine estuary to the north, the Risle valley to the east, the Charentonne valley to the south and, in the west, the Pays d'Auge which corresponds to the Touques basin.

The economy is primarily agricultural.  The largest towns are Beuzeville, Épaignes, Lieurey and Thiberville.

External links
Tourism office of Vièvre Lieuvin

Geography of Eure
Former provinces of France
Normandy region articles needing translation from French Wikipedia